Maoricolpus roseus is a species of sea snail, a marine gastropod mollusc in the family Turritellidae. 

A subspecies of this species has been described: Maoricolpus roseus manukauensis Powell, 1931. But it is now considered a synonym.

Description
The length of the shell attains 41.8 mm.

Distribution
This species found only in New Zealand.

References

 Marwick, J. (1931). The Tertiary Mollusca of the Gisborne District. New Zealand Geological Survey Paleontological Bulletin 13:1-177. 18: pls.
 Probst, T. A. & Crawford, C. M. (2008) Population characteristics and planktonic larval stage of the New Zealand screwshell Maoricolpus roseus. Journal of Molluscan Studies 74(2):191-197
 Maxwell, P.A. (2009). Cenozoic Mollusca. Pp 232-254 in Gordon, D.P. (ed.) New Zealand inventory of biodiversity. Volume one. Kingdom Animalia: Radiata, Lophotrochozoa, Deuterostomia. Canterbury University Press, Christchurch.
 Grove, S. 2011. The Seashells of Tasmania: A Comprehensive Guide. Taroona, Australia: Taroona Publications. [vi], 81

External links
 Quoy J.R.C. & Gaimard J.P. (1832-1835). Voyage de découvertes de l'"Astrolabe" exécuté par ordre du Roi, pendant les années 1826-1829, sous le commandement de M. J. Dumont d'Urville. Zoologie.
 Powell A. W. B., New Zealand Mollusca, William Collins Publishers Ltd, Auckland, New Zealand 1979 
 Suter H. (1908). Additions to the marine molluscan fauna of New Zealand, with descriptions of new species. Proceedings of the Malacological Society of London. 8: 22-42, pls 2-3
 Kiener, L.C. (1838). Spécies général et iconographie des coquilles vivantes. Vol. 10. Famille des Turbinacées. Genre Turritelle (Turritella, Lam.), pp. 1-46, pl. 1-14 [pp. 1-46 (1844), pl. 1-3, 5, 7-14 (1843), 4, 6 (1844); Scalaire (Scalaria, Lam.), pp. 1-22, pl. 1-7 [all (1838)]; Cadran (Solarium,Lam.), pp. 1-12, pl. 1-4 [all (1838)]; Roulette (Rotella, Lam.), pp. 1-10, pl. 1-3 [all (1838)]; Dauphinule (Dephinula, Lam.), pp. 1-12, pl. 1-4 [pp. 1-10 (1838), 11-12 (1842); pl. 1 (1837), 2-4 (1838]; Phasianelle (Phasianella, Lam.), pp. 1-11, pl. 1-5 [pp. 1-11 (1850); pl. 1-3, 5 (1847), 4 (1848)]; Famille des Plicacées de Lamarck, et des Trochoides de Cuvier. Genre Tornatelle (Tornatella, Lamarck), pp. 3-6, pl. 1 [all (1834)]; Genre Pyramidelle (Pyramidella), Lamarck, pp. 1-8, pl. 1-2 [all (1835)]; [Famille des Myacées.] Genre Thracie (Thracia, Leach), pp. 1-7, pl. 1-2 ]
  Molnar, J. L.; Gamboa, R. L.; Revenga, C.; Spalding, M. D. (2008). Assessing the global threat of invasive species to marine biodiversity. Frontiers in Ecology and the Environment. 6(9): 485-492
  Reeve, L. A. (1849). Monograph of the genus Turritella. In: Conchologia Iconica, or, illustrations of the shells of molluscous animals, vol. 5, pl. 1-11 and unpaginated text. L. Reeve & Co., London
 

Turritellidae
Gastropods of New Zealand
Gastropods described in 1834
Endemic molluscs of New Zealand
Endemic fauna of New Zealand